Walter Ray Perkins (November 6, 1941 – December 9, 2020) was an American football coach and player. He played as a wide receiver for the University of Alabama and Baltimore Colts. He later worked as a football coach for 28 years, including stints as the head coach for the New York Giants, the University of Alabama, Tampa Bay Buccaneers, and Arkansas State University.

Early life and college career
Perkins was born in Petal, Mississippi.  He attended The University of Alabama, playing football 1964–1966. He played for coach Bear Bryant and was a teammate of Pro Football Hall of Fame quarterbacks Joe Namath and Ken Stabler.  The Crimson Tide won national championships in both 1964 and 1965, and Southeastern Conference championships in 1964, 1965, and 1966. During his senior year, he was named team captain. He was also selected as an All-American in 1966.

1964: 11 catches for 139 yards and 1 touchdown.
1965: 19 catches for 279 yards and 1 touchdown.
1966: 33 catches for 490 yards and 7 touchdowns.

NFL career
He played for the National Football League's Baltimore Colts as a wide receiver from 1967 to 1971, initially under coach Don Shula.  Perkins caught a 68-yard touchdown pass from Johnny Unitas in the 1970 AFC Championship Game to lead the Colts to a 27–17 victory over the Oakland Raiders and a berth in Super Bowl V. Perkins went on to win a Super Bowl ring after the Colts beat the Dallas Cowboys in Super Bowl V.

Coaching career
Perkins coached in the NFL as an assistant for the New England Patriots (1974–1977) and San Diego Chargers (1978) before becoming head coach of the New York Giants from 1979 to 1982. Although he only had one winning season, he helped build the team that his successor, Bill Parcells, won two Super Bowls with in 1986 and 1990.  Perkins hired future NFL head coaches Parcells, Bill Belichick and Romeo Crennel as young assistants, and was the first NFL coach for future Most Valuable Player and Hall of Fame linebacker Lawrence Taylor and future Super Bowl Most Valuable Player Phil Simms.

When Bryant retired after the 1982 season, Perkins took on the daunting task of succeeding him at Alabama. He coached the Crimson Tide for four years from 1983 to 1986, compiling a record of 32–15–1. However, he went 5–6 in 1984, the school's first losing season since 1957, the year before Bryant's tenure began. Although he won three bowl games during his tenure, it was far short of what Alabama fans had come to expect. Increasing pressure from boosters and alumni at Alabama made Perkins receptive to a lucrative contract offer from the Tampa Bay Buccaneers after the 1986 Alabama season.

Perkins served as head coach and general manager of the Tampa Bay Buccaneers from 1987 to 1990. Some of his former college players got a chance to play for him in the NFL: QB Mike Shula, Kurt Jarvis, and linebacker Keith McCants. His career coaching record in the NFL was 42–75. He never won more than five games in Tampa Bay; his tenure came during an NFL-record streak of 12 consecutive 10-loss seasons. He was fired midway through the 1990 season, and replaced by his offensive coordinator, fellow Alabama alumnus Richard Williamson. Perkins returned to college coaching at Arkansas State University in 1992. After just one year, Perkins became the offensive coordinator of the New England Patriots, serving under Bill Parcells from 1993 to 1996. He also spent 1997 with the Oakland Raiders as an offensive coordinator.

On December 20, 2011, he was introduced as the new head football coach at Jones County Junior College (JCJC) in Ellisville, Mississippi.  Perkins resigned from JCJC on December 24, 2013.  He resided in Hattiesburg, Mississippi. In 2014, he was said to be taking a volunteer coaching role with Oak Grove High School in
Hattiesburg.

Recruitment allegations
In 1992, former Alabama player Gene Jelks, who had been recruited by Perkins, publicly accused Alabama coaches and boosters of providing him with illegal cash payments and other inducements during his recruitment and years at Alabama (Jelks played from 1985 to 1989).  Jelks's charges resulted in a National Collegiate Athletic Association (NCAA) investigation of the Alabama football program.  Perkins's former assistant coach Jerry Pullen sued Jelks for slander, but he lost that case and two subsequent appeals, including an appeal to the Georgia Supreme Court.

Death
Perkins died at his home on the morning of December 9, 2020, at 79 years old.

Honors
 SEC Player of the Year, 1966
 First-Team All-American, Split end, 1966
 Inducted into the Alabama Sports Hall of Fame, Class of 1990
 Inducted into the Mississippi Sports Hall of Fame, Class of 1998
 Elected to the Senior Bowl Hall of Fame in 2005

Head coaching record

College

NFL

See also
 History of the New York Giants (1979–93)
 New England Patriots strategy

References

External links
 

1941 births
2020 deaths
American football wide receivers
Alabama Crimson Tide athletic directors
Alabama Crimson Tide football coaches
Alabama Crimson Tide football players
Arkansas State Red Wolves football coaches
Baltimore Colts players
Cleveland Browns coaches
Jones County Bobcats football coaches
Mississippi State Bulldogs football coaches
National Football League general managers
National Football League offensive coordinators
New England Patriots coaches
New York Giants head coaches
Tampa Bay Buccaneers head coaches
San Diego Chargers coaches
Oakland Raiders coaches
High school football coaches in Mississippi
All-American college football players
People from Petal, Mississippi
Coaches of American football from Mississippi
Players of American football from Mississippi